Džemal Berberović (born 5 November 1981) is a retired Bosnian professional footballer who played as a right back.

Club career
Berberović started his career at FK Sarajevo. At age 22, he signed with German club Bayer Leverkusen, but did not play in official matches. In January 2005, he returned for six months to Bosnia and Herzegovina. Berberović played for and captained FK Sarajevo in the Bosnian-HerzegovinianPremier League before he moved to Litex Lovech in June 2005. In January 2009, he was transferred to the Turkish Süper Lig team Denizlispor. In June 2010, he moved back to Litex Lovech. In July 2011, he was transferred to the German 2. Bundesliga club MSV Duisburg.

International career
He has made some very important appearances for the Bosnia and Herzegovina national under-21 football team. He made his senior debut for Bosnia and Herzegovina in a February 2003 friendly match away against Wales and has earned a total of 33 caps, scoring no goals. His final international was a June 2010 friendly against Germany.

Berberović concluded his international career on 29 July 2010.

Career statistics

International

Honours

Club
FK Sarajevo
Premier League of Bosnia and Herzegovina: 2014–15
Bosnia and Herzegovina Football Cup (2): 2001–02, 2004–05

Litex Lovech
Bulgarian Cup: 2007–08
Bulgarian A PFG: 2010–11

Individual
Ismir Pintol trophy: 2005

References

External links

1981 births
Living people
Footballers from Sarajevo
Bosniaks of Bosnia and Herzegovina
Association football fullbacks
Bosnia and Herzegovina footballers
Bosnia and Herzegovina youth international footballers
Bosnia and Herzegovina under-21 international footballers
Bosnia and Herzegovina international footballers
FK Sarajevo players
Bayer 04 Leverkusen players
VfL Osnabrück players
PFC Litex Lovech players
FC Kuban Krasnodar players
Denizlispor footballers
MSV Duisburg players
MSV Duisburg II players
Premier League of Bosnia and Herzegovina players
2. Bundesliga players
First Professional Football League (Bulgaria) players
Russian Premier League players
Süper Lig players
Regionalliga players
Bosnia and Herzegovina expatriate footballers
Expatriate footballers in Germany
Bosnia and Herzegovina expatriate sportspeople in Germany
Expatriate footballers in Bulgaria
Bosnia and Herzegovina expatriate sportspeople in Bulgaria
Expatriate footballers in Russia
Bosnia and Herzegovina expatriate sportspeople in Russia
Expatriate footballers in Turkey
Bosnia and Herzegovina expatriate sportspeople in Turkey